Aladár Körösfői-Kriesch (29 October 1863 – 16 June 1920) was a Hungarian Art Nouveau painter.

He was born in Buda, the son of hydro-biologist and zoologist János Kriesch. He was a co-founder with Sándor Nagy of the Gödöllő Art Colony, which introduced Art Nouveau style (also called Secession) in Hungary.

Bibliography
 Kovalovszky, Márta: A modern magyar festészet remekei: 1896-2003. Corvina, Budapest, 2005. "Körösfői-Kriesch Aladár" p. 23. ;
 Nagy, Sándor: Életünk Körösfői Kriesch Aladárral (Gödöllő, 2005.)
 Körösfői-Kriesch Aladár - Artportal

1863 births
1920 deaths
Hungarian painters
Art Nouveau painters
People from Buda